Alexandra Kyle (born November 11, 1988) is an American actress from Los Angeles, California.

Career 
Kyle appeared in 1996's Eye for an Eye starring Sally Field and Kiefer Sutherland. She co-starred again with Sutherland in 1996's A Time to Kill, which also starred Sandra Bullock, Samuel L. Jackson, Matthew McConaughey, Ashley Judd and Kevin Spacey.

She had a lead role in 1998's In Quiet Night, and made guest appearances spots on JAG, ER and The Practice.

In 2004, she had a part in Gary Winick's film 13 Going on 30 as the young Tom-Tom, the younger version of Judy Greer's character Lucy, in which she was both praised for the perfect portrait of the character and the uncanny resemblance to her older version.

She made a guest appearance on Without a Trace on CBS, which aired as the fourth episode of the fifth season in 2006.

In 2011, she landed the role of Leah, a 17-year-old runaway, on NBC's long-running soap opera Days of Our Lives and was also cast as Shelly in "DisCONNECTED", an MTV Original Movie based on the true story of Abraham K. Biggs.

She also played the minor role of Roz, a teenager who is a petty criminal on Justified.

Filmography

Film

Television

Other work

External links
 

1988 births
American child actresses
American film actresses
Living people
Actresses from Los Angeles
Crossroads School alumni
American television actresses
20th-century American actresses
21st-century American actresses
American soap opera actresses